The Loud House is an American sitcomedy multimedia franchise based on creator Chris Savino's own experiences with his large family, primarily based on the television series The Loud House (2016–present), its spin-off series, The Casagrandes (2019–2022), the films The Loud House Movie (2021) and A Loud House Christmas (2021), and the live-action spin-off of the latter film The Really Loud House (2022–present). Set in the fictional town and city of Royal Woods, Michigan and Great Lakes City, the following is an abridged list of characters consisting of the titular families and supporting characters from all five.

Cast table

The Loud family

Lincoln Loud
Lincoln Albert Loud (voiced by Sean Ryan Fox in the pilot "Bathroom Break!!", Grant Palmer in S1E1A-S1E22B, Collin Dean in S1E23A-S3E18A, singing voice by Jackson Petty in S3E17, Tex Hammond in S3E18B-S4E21B, Asher Bishop in S4E23A-S6E3A, Bentley Griffin in S6E4-Present and Nickelodeon All-Star Brawl, portrayed by Wolfgang Schaeffer in A Loud House Christmas and The Really Loud House, Justin Allan as a young boy in The Really Loud House) is an 11-year-old boy (12-year-old season 5 onward and The Really Loud House) with white hair who is the middle child and the only son in the Loud family. The character got his name from E Lincoln Avenue in Royal Oak where the show's creator Chris Savino grew up. Lincoln has a passion for comic books, especially his favorite superhero Ace Savvy who has a playing card theme as well as secret agent David Steele. Lincoln is also the family nerd along with Lisa. He is also, however, the primary leader of his ten sisters, as he typically plans schemes, strategies, and "operations" for better convenience, as well as to help others, that the girls more often than not follow. Lincoln has other talents, including cooking, playing video games, performing magic tricks, and coaching his younger sister Lola to prepare her for her pageants.  Lincoln wears an orange polo shirt, blue jeans, gray socks, and white sneakers. Lincoln often breaks the fourth wall by talking to the audience about living with all of his sisters and considers himself the "man with a plan." He tries to give helpful advice concerning sibling relationships. For the first four seasons, Lincoln attends Royal Woods Elementary School with his younger sisters Lucy, Lana, Lola, and Lisa and is a 5th grader there. In "The Loudest Thanksgiving", it is revealed that Lincoln is vulnerable to tryptophan which causes him to fall asleep before Thanksgiving dessert is served. In "Schooled!", Lincoln starts attending Royal Woods Middle School and transitions to 6th grade. As of that episode, Lincoln attends school with his older sister Lynn.

Lori Loud
Lori L. Loud (voiced by Catherine Taber, portrayed by Lexi DiBenedetto in A Loud House Christmas and The Really Loud House) is the 17-year-old (18-year-old season 5 onward and The Really Loud House) eldest child of the Loud family. She is named after one of Savino's five sisters. Lori is the roommate of her younger sister Leni before she starts attending Fairway University as of "Schooled!". While Lori is often bossy, short-tempered, and condescending towards her younger siblings, she cares deeply about her family. She also has a long-distance sweetheart named Bobby Santiago. Lori wears a light blue tank top, brown cargo shorts, blue slip-on shoes, and white pearl earrings. As she is the only Loud child with a driver's license, Lori usually forces her siblings to do errands for her in exchange for being transported somewhere. However, as of Lana's Living Out Loud podcast and "Driver's Dread", it is revealed that Leni has obtained her driver's license. Lori also occasionally has intense flatulence, which she denies, claiming that the sound was made by her shoes or another object like loose floorboards or a car seat. Lori is highly skilled at playing golf and is the first student in her school to join the golf varsity team as a freshman. For the first four seasons, she is a senior at Royal Woods High School and attends school with her younger sisters Leni, Luna, and Luan. As of "Schooled!", she now attends Fairway University.

Leni Loud
Leni L. Loud (voiced by Liliana Mumy, portrayed by Dora Dolphin in A Loud House Christmas, Eva Carlton in The Really Loud House) is the 16-year-old (17-year-old season 5 onward and The Really Loud House) second child of the Loud family. Leni is named after the character Lennie Small, a mentally-challenged but compassionate, curious, and physically strong companion of George Milton in John Steinbeck's novella Of Mice and Men. Leni and her older sister Lori are roommates until Lori attends Fairway University as of "Schooled!". Leni wears a seafoam green dress, red hoop earrings, white sandals with seafoam green bows (these were replaced with white boots in the live-action media), and white sunglasses on her head. She often goes shopping at the Royal Woods Mall. She has a fear of spiders that is referenced in multiple episodes, most notably "Along Came a Sister". Along with Luna, Leni has the best older sister relationship with Lincoln. Leni occasionally fights with Lori over things such as clothes. Leni was hired to fold clothes at Reininger's Department Store at the Royal Woods Mall. She frequently tends to be absent-minded, which requires her siblings correct her on things she misunderstood about. She didn't have a driver's license or know how to drive Vanzilla in "Driving Miss Hazy", but Lana's "Listen Out Loud" podcast reveals that she is now able to drive, although she hasn't in any actual episodes due to a lack of confidence during the actual exam. Leni is a junior at Royal Woods High School for the first four seasons and attends school with her sisters Lori, Luna, and Luan. As of "Schooled!", Leni becomes the oldest sibling in the house while Lori is away at Fairway University, is a senior, and attends school with Luna and Luan. As of "Driver's Dread", Leni eventually becomes successful in driving and got her driver's license.

Luna Loud
Luna Loud (voiced by Nika Futterman, portrayed by Sophia Woodward in A Loud House Christmas and The Really Loud House, Ava Torres as a young girl in The Really Loud House) is the 15-year-old (16-year-old season 5 onward and The Really Loud House) third child of the Loud family and Luan's roommate. She is named after a pet dachshund Chris Savino's mother-in-law owned. She wears a purple shirt with a skull, a lavender skirt, a white belt, high purple boots, black paperclip earrings, three bracelets, and a choker. Luna is a wild and upbeat musician who owns and plays various instruments; her signature instrument is a purple Dean ML electric guitar. Her passion for music has some negative effects, as in the episode "For Bros About to Rock" it is revealed that she unintentionally "ruined" her siblings' first concerts. The episodes "Study Muffin" and "L is for Love" revealed that Luna is bisexual, because she is attracted both to Lincoln's male tutor Hugh and a female classmate named Sam Sharp. Luna's siblings are aware that Sam is female, and are supportive of Luna's crush on her. Showrunner Michael Rubiner said that "with 10 girls in the family", the crew felt natural "to explore one of them being LGBTQ". As of the episode "Racing Hearts", Luna and Sam are officially dating. Both of them formed the band Moon Goats with their friends, who made up most of the music club. In the episode "Dad Reputation", Luna joins Lynn Loud Sr.'s band The Doo-Dads as its guitar player. Luna is a sophomore at Royal Woods High School for the first four seasons and attends school with her sisters Lori, Leni, and Luan. However, as of "Schooled!", she is a junior and attends school with Leni and Luan.

Luan Loud
Luan Loud (voiced by Cristina Pucelli, portrayed by Catherine Ashmore Bradley in A Loud House Christmas and The Really Loud House) is the 14-year-old (15-year-old season 5 onward and The Really Loud House) fourth child of the Loud family, the roommate of Luna and is named after one of Savino's five sisters. She is depicted as the comedian of the house, with most of her dialogue consisting of bad puns that annoy her siblings. Luan wears braces, a white sleeveless shirt, a yellow skirt, yellow socks, brown shoes, and 3 pink flowers. Every April Fools' Day, Luan becomes a sadistic prank-obsessed maniac, which causes her family and Clyde to fear of the holiday. While the pranks she pulls are mostly successful, the tables are occasionally turned against her as seen in the episodes "Fool's Paradise" and "Fool Me Twice". In the latter, Luan has stopped pulling pranks; however, in the episode "Silence of the Luans", Lily pulls pranks on their family, convincing Luan to resume pranking. Luan also has other talents, including performing as an expert birthday clown, juggler, magician, mime artist, and ventriloquist. Luan owns a dummy named Mr. Coconuts that she uses as part of her ventriloquy acts. Luan often gets jealous of her other siblings, as shown in the episode "Funny Business" in which Lincoln begins to overshadow Luan as a birthday clown. Luan is a freshman at Royal Woods High School for the first four seasons and attends school with her older sisters Lori, Leni, and Luna. However, as of "Schooled!", Luan is a sophomore and attends school with only Leni and Luna.

Lynn Loud Jr.
Lynn Loud Jr. (voiced by Jessica DiCicco, portrayed by Morgan McGill in A Loud House Christmas, Annaka Fourneret in The Really Loud House) is the 13-year-old (14-year-old season 5 onward and The Really Loud House) athletic fifth child of the Loud family and Lucy's roommate. She is named after one of Savino's five sisters (Lynn). Lynn tends to start competitions among her siblings and plays a large number of different sports. She is highly superstitious, because she does not want to lose her winning streaks. Lynn wears a red and white jersey, track shorts, white high-knee socks, and black cleats. Unlike Lori, Lynn is not insecure when she passes gas. She does not hesitate to burp out loud or to do things such as a Dutch oven on Lincoln. Lynn is also an expert at ninjutsu and can even run on all-fours while carrying someone on her back. In the episode "Middle Men", it is revealed that Lynn developed a brash personality when she started middle school because she was bullied throughout her first year. Lynn attends Royal Woods Middle School as a 7th grader with no other siblings for the first four seasons. However, as of "Schooled!", Lincoln attends middle school with her and she is an 8th grader.

Lucy Loud
Lucy L. Loud (voiced by Jessica DiCicco, portrayed by Aubin Bradley in A Loud House Christmas and The Really Loud House) is the 8-year-old (9-year-old season 5 onward and The Really Loud House) seventh child of the Loud family and Lynn's roommate. Her name came from Savino's and his wife's plans to name potential daughters. Lucy wears a black dress, long white sleeves and stockings with black stripes, and black shoes. She has pale white skin and long black hair with bangs that cover her eyes. She looks identical to the Loud children's great-grandmother Harriet. Lucy often seems to appear out of nowhere, which often frightens her siblings. She is also a fortune-teller, and her predictions turn out to happen very literally. At school, Lucy is a part of the Morticians' Club with similar students. Lucy has a bust of the vampire Edwin, who is from her favorite book and TV series The Vampires of Melancholia. While she pledges to be with Edwin in the afterlife, her crush is Rusty Spokes' younger brother Rocky. Lucy is a 3rd grader at Royal Woods Elementary School for the first four seasons and attends school with her siblings Lincoln, Lana, Lola, and Lisa. But, as of "Schooled!", Lucy is a 4th grader and attends school with her younger sisters Lana, Lola, and Lisa.

Lana Loud
Lana Loud (voiced by Grey DeLisle, portrayed by Mia Allan in A Loud House Christmas and The Really Loud House) is the 6-year-old (7-year-old season 5 onward and The Really Loud House) eighth child of the Loud family, and is named after one of Savino's five sisters. The episode "Ties That Bind" reveals that Lana is the identical twin sister of her roommate Lola and was born two minutes before her, making Lana the older twin. Lana usually wears a red baseball cap backwards or sideways, a murky green t-shirt, dark blue overalls, and white sneakers. She is a tomboy who loves to get her hands dirty. Lana is a skilled handy worker, plumber, and mechanic who loves animals, especially frogs and reptiles. She will always defend animals from any possible harm. Lana also has a close bond with her sister Lola, who she hangs out and works together with. Throughout the series, she acts like a dog, especially when she eats trash or dog food. In Leni's Listen Out Loud podcast, Leni and Lincoln state that the family buys Lana food and toys at the pet shop. Lana is in 1st grade at Royal Woods Elementary School for the first four seasons and attends school with Lincoln, Lucy, Lola, and Lisa. In "Schooled!", Lana attends 2nd grade with her sisters Lucy, Lola, and Lisa.

Lola Loud
Lola Loud (voiced by Grey DeLisle, portrayed by Ella Allan in A Loud House Christmas and The Really Loud House) is the 6-year-old (7-year-old season 5 onward and The Really Loud House) ninth child of the Loud family and the identical twin sister of her roommate Lana. The episode "Ties That Bind" reveals that Lola was born two minutes after Lana, making her the younger twin. She is named after a pet Dachshund of Savino's. Lola is depicted as a "Princess" who plots and schemes to get her way, and becomes maniacal if her siblings or anyone else angers her in any way. She is usually seen wearing a long pink gown, sash, a white pearl necklace and earrings, long pink gloves, pink high heels, and a tiara. Lola constantly enters child beauty pageants. When her siblings confess to each other things they did, Lola often rats on them, especially Lincoln. Underneath her mean-spirited exterior, Lola is shown to be forgiving and affectionate and admits to herself that she is a "crazy pants" sometimes. There is a running gag that comedically exaggerates Lola's strength when she gets angry, as when she single-handedly subdues her oldest sister Lori. Both she and Lana use a pink jeep as their mode of transportation around Royal Woods. Lola is in 1st grade at Royal Woods Elementary School for the first four seasons and attends school with Lincoln, Lucy, Lana, and Lisa. In "Schooled!", Lola attends 2nd grade with her sisters Lucy, Lana, and Lisa.

Lisa Loud
Lisa Loud (voiced by Lara Jill Miller, portrayed by Lexi Janicek in A Loud House Christmas and The Really Loud House) is the 4-year-old (5-year-old season 5 onward and The Really Loud House) 10th child of the Loud family, and is named after one of Savino's five sisters. Lisa is a gifted child prodigy who has a Ph.D. and is a Junior Nobel Prize recipient, but is currently in kindergarten by her own choice. Lisa enjoys solving complex equations, math problems, and performing elaborate experiments in which she often uses her unaware siblings and Clyde as test subjects. She wears glasses, an olive green turtleneck sweater, dark pink pants, and brown loafers. Her brown hair was revealed to be a wig in "Potty Mouth", having burnt it due to a botched nuclear experiment. Lisa often uses formal and detailed terms to refer to basic things before saying it in layman's terms. She often tends to be quite reckless and unethical with her experiments but is ultimately a good-hearted girl. A running gag is that Lisa's beakers filled with compound mixtures tend to explode, which occasionally mutate her body. She is also a fan of west coast rap music and is very good at breakdancing. Despite her intellect, Lisa struggles greatly with simple things such as arts and crafts because of her stubby fingers and also struggles to form friendships with her peers. Some of Lisa's inventions include an assortment of robots, Gloweos (cookies infused with the bioluminescent DNA of the Aequorea victoria that make the consumer glow in the dark for a short time), a Urine Detector liquid that removes urine from bodies of water, Gravity Shoes that enable her to walk on the ceiling, a chocolate fountain that started out as a nuclear fusion device until she dropped her chocolate bar in it, a compatibility machine used to match up two people, robotic kangaroo legs to go with Lisa and Lily's shared kangaroo costume, overly-effective lie-detecting products, and a chemical analysis machine. Lisa attends Royal Woods Elementary School as a kindergartner for the first four seasons with her older siblings Lincoln, Lucy, Lana, and Lola. In "Schooled!", Lisa begins 1st grade with her sisters Lucy, Lana, and Lola.

Lily Loud
Lily Loud (voiced by Grey DeLisle, portrayed by Charlotte Anne Tucker and Lainey Jane Knowles in A Loud House Christmas, August Michael Peterson and Emily Ford in The Really Loud House) is the 1-year-old baby (2-year-old toddler season 5 onward and The Really Loud House) of the Loud family as well as the youngest child and Lisa's roommate. She is generally happy-go-lucky, but she is also intelligent and has a mischievous streak. Her name came from Savino and his wife's plans for having daughters. In the first four seasons, Lily is usually seen wearing only a diaper. From the fifth season on, Lily is seen wearing a white shirt, lavender shorts, and white booties. Lily is babysat by Lincoln on several occasions. She has a habit of losing her diaper, which her older siblings put back on. Her siblings and her parents always change Lily's diaper in her and Lisa's room. The only phrase aide from gibberish Lily says is "poo-poo", usually as her diaper flies across the screen or she needs a diaper change. However, as of "Schooled!", Lily is now potty trained. Lily shares a room with her older sister Lisa and her gibberish can sometimes be translated by her older siblings. Around the end of "Washed Up", Lily is the only one who sees Lake Eddy's residential cryptid Plessy which Lincoln and Lucy wanted to find. In "Any Given Sundae", Lily tries her first ice cream and enjoys it. In "Schooled!", Lily starts saying more words, refers to herself in the third person, starts wearing clothes, and is reluctant to start preschool at Baby Bunker Preschool until she saw Leni's posts of the preschool.

Lynn Loud Sr.
Lynn Loud Sr. (voiced in the animated series and portrayed in A Loud House Christmas and The Really Loud House by Brian Stepanek) is the father of the Loud children. His complete face is unseen until the second-season episode "11 Louds a Leapin'". Lynn Sr. often breaks up fights between his children before they grow too violent and often has his emotional moments. He is completely clueless on the use modern technologies to the point of not knowing how to text and is an expert at playing the cowbell. Lynn Sr. wears a sea green sweater, brown slacks and shoes. For employment, Lynn Sr. used to work in IT before pursuing a culinary career as he does all the cooking for his family. His dream is finally realized in the episode "Cooked!" when he opens up his own restaurant called Lynn's Table. In "Recipe for Disaster", it is revealed that Lynn Sr. learned some of the ingredients for his dishes from his home economics teacher, who now owns the Frosty Farms Frozen Foods company. In "Dad Reputation", Lynn Sr. starts a band called the Doo-Dads, which consist of 5 members: himself, Harold, Kotaro, Rodney, and Luna. In "Present Danger", it is revealed that Lynn Loud Sr. is a fan of David Steele.

Rita Loud
Rita Loud (voiced by Jill Talley, portrayed by Muretta Moss in A Loud House Christmas, Jolie Jenkins in The Really Loud House) is the mother of the Loud children. Her complete face is unseen until the second-season episode "11 Louds a Leapin'". Rita deeply cares about her children, but she is not afraid to punish them if their fighting grows too extreme. Rita wears a dark pink buttoned shirt, purple pants, white earrings, and black flats. It is revealed in the episodes "Cover Girls" and "L is for Love" that she met Lynn Sr. when she was working as a crossing guard. Rita's family includes her father Albert, from whom she learned how to drive a plane and a tank. She also has one aunt named Ruth. Rita works as a dental assistant under the dentist Dr. Feinstein, though she is working to become an author. In "Write and Wrong", Rita gets a job at the Royal Woods Gazette.

Other Loud family members

Leonard "Gramps" Loud
Leonard Loud (voiced by Rick Zieff) is the Lynn Sr.'s father, Rita Loud's father-in-law, and the kids' paternal grandfather who was talked a lot by Lynn Sr. Like his son, Leonard can get emotional at times. While originally designed to look like a hippie in a flashback seen in "Vantastic Voyage", he was later redesigned in his official debut in "Camped" where he resembled Lynn Sr. with a longer beard. Leonard was originally a traveling fisherman as seen in "Camped" until he got word from his son when Camp Mastodon was closing. When the treasure was found and he used his boat to save his family, Leonard offered to use the treasure to keep Camp Mastodon opened as its new proprietor so that he can be closer to his family. In "Present Danger", it is revealed that Leonard is a fan of David Steele. In "Bummer Camp", Leonard learns how to be a camper from his grandchildren.

Albert "Pop Pop"
Albert (voiced by Fred Willard in S1E15A-S4E14B, Christopher Swindle in S5E9B, Piotr Michael in S5E25B-Present, portrayed by Bill Southworth in A Loud House Christmas) is the kids' maternal grandfather, Lynn Loud Sr.'s father-in-law, Rita's father, and Ruth's brother. He is often called "Pop Pop" by his grandchildren. It is revealed in the series that he was a former member of the United States military until his retirement. Albert wears a white button-up shirt, blue jean overalls with orange suspenders, a black belt, and white sneakers. He has a good relationship with his daughter and is very close to Lincoln, with whom he shares the same hair color and hairstyle. While it was revealed in "Cover Girls" that Albert is near-sighted, this is never brought up again in later episodes. Starting in "The Old and the Restless", Albert moved into Sunset Canyon Retirement Home where his old friends live. In "Pop Pop the Question", he proposes to Myrtle and are currently engaged.

Myrtle
Myrtle (voiced by Jennifer Coolidge) is the girlfriend of Albert, making her the Loud children's unofficial grandmother. Because she traveled extensively in her youth prior to meeting Albert, Myrtle never married or had children of her own. When she became Albert's girlfriend, she started to treat the Loud children as her own grandchildren. Upon accepting her, the children started to call her "Gran-Gran" as she had wanted them to call her. The episode "Resident Upheaval" reveals that Myrtle does not live at Sunset Canyon Retirement Home and only visits Albert there. By the end of the episode, Myrtle moves into Sunset Canyon Retirement Home with Gayle as a roommate. In "Pop Pop the Question", Myrtle propose to Albert while officially becoming the Loud children's official step-grandmother. It is also revealed that when she was younger, she was a secret agent who was in fake marriages with her partners as part of her cover on different missions. Her skills do help Lincoln perfect his spy tumbling.

Ruth
Ruth (voiced by Grey DeLisle) is Albert's sister, Lynn Loud Sr.'s aunt-in-law, Rita's paternal aunt, and the Loud children's maternal great-aunt. She is depicted as a cat lady with a distasteful attitude, because she makes the kids eat old pudding and watch her cats when the Loud family visits. She wears an olive green dress with flowers on it and white shoes. Ruth is also shown to have a sixth toe on her left foot which creeps out even Lynn Sr. Only Rita, Lana, and later Lily are the ones who can tolerate visiting her.

Loud family pets
The Loud family has different pets in their house who usually show the same emotions as the children on different occasions.

The main family pets include:

 Charles (vocal effects provided by Dee Bradley Baker) - A black and white Miniature Bull Terrier who has freckles and black concentric circles on his back and left eye. Charles is usually seen sleeping in Lincoln's room.
 Cliff (vocal effects provided by Dee Bradley Baker) - A black-furred domestic short-haired cat with a large black nose and small ears.
 Geo (vocal effects provided by Audrey Wasilewski) - A hamster who travels in a hamster ball.
 Walt (vocal effects provided by Dee Bradley Baker) - A yellow canary who often has an angry expression on his face and is strong enough to lift Lily.

The Loud siblings also have their own pets:

 Hops - Lana's pet frog and "best friend" since they first met while she was swimming in a pond in the episode "Frog Wild". He helps her out in times of need.
 Bitey - Lana's pet rat.
 Izzy - Lana's pet lizard.
 El Diablo - Lana's pet snake.
 Duncan - Lana's pet opossum.
 Gary - Luan's pet rabbit.
 Fangs - Lucy's pet vampire bat. Fangs often joins Lucy in some of her activities.

Lisa's robots
Lisa Loud has made an assortment of robots in order of appearance:

 Mr. Reinforced Titanium Alloy Arms (voiced by Jeff Bennett) - A robot that was created by Lisa who sports a mailbox-like torso and tank treads for feet.
 Todd (voiced by Brian Stepanek in the cartoon series and The Really Loud House) - A robot that was created by Lisa from different devices. He has a bucket for a head, a calculator on his forehead, a corkscrew neck, a printer for a chest (it was substituted with a Nintendo Entertainment System in The Really Loud House), building toy arms where a magnet serves as a left hand and a pair of scissors serve as a right hand, a sound amplifier lower body, a fire extinguisher on his back, and different bicycle wheels instead of feet. Todd would sometimes assist Lisa in her projects.

The McBride family

Clyde McBride
Clyde McBride (voiced by Caleel Harris in S1E1A-S3E8A, Andre Robinson in S3E8B-S5E26B, portrayed and voiced by Jahzir Bruno in A Loud House Christmas, S6E1A-S6E15B, and The Really Loud House, Jaeden White in S6E19A-Present) is an 11-year-old boy (12-year-old season 5 onward) who is best friends with Lincoln. He owns a walkie-talkie that he uses on "missions" with Lincoln and is usually up-to-date on code words used when conveying messages. Clyde and Lincoln share many interests, such as video games and science fiction movies. He used to have an unrequited crush on Lori and tended to get nosebleeds, faints whenever he saw her, and/or he acts like a malfunctioned robot. He wears circular glasses, a yellow and blue striped sweater, black pants, and black tennis shoes. When Lincoln cosplays as Ace Savvy, Clyde dresses as Ace's sidekick One-Eyed Jack. Clyde is a 5th grader at Royal Woods Elementary School until "Schooled!" when he begins attending Royal Woods Middle School as a 6th-grader. He is also an accomplished pastry chef and baker.

Howard McBride

Howard McBride (voiced by Michael McDonald, portrayed by Justin Michael Stevenson in A Loud House Christmas, Stephen Guarino in The Really Loud House) is Clyde's overprotective red-haired white father, who cares deeply about his son's well-being. While showering Clyde with attention, Howard rarely lets him do anything unsupervised as he tends to get overemotional while watching his son grow up. Both Harold and Howard wear brown slacks, a pair of jeans, white sneakers, brown loafer shoes, a red collared shirt, a blue/teal sweater vest, a black bow tie, and a light blue shirt. The McBrides, who are an interracial couple, are the first married gay couple to be featured in a Nickelodeon animated series.

Harold McBride

Harold McBride (voiced by Wayne Brady in S1E09A-S6E11A, Khary Payton in S6E19A-Present, portrayed by Marcus Folmar in A Loud House Christmas, Ray Ford in The Really Loud House) is Clyde's overprotective black father, and the son of Gayle, who cares deeply about their son's well-being. While showering Clyde with attention along with Howard, they rarely let him do anything unsupervised. Both Howard and Harold wear brown slacks, a pair of jeans, white sneakers, brown loafer shoes, a red collared shirt, a blue/teal sweater vest, a black bow tie, and a light blue shirt. The McBrides, who are an interracial couple, are the first married gay couple to be featured in a Nickelodeon animated series. In the episode "Dad Reputation", Harold joins Lynn Loud Sr.'s group The Doo-Dads and plays the accordion.

Gayle McBride
Gayle McBride (voiced by Loretta Devine, portrayed by Gail Everett-Smith in A Loud House Christmas) is the mother of Harold and the adoptive grandmother of Clyde. She was mentioned a lot in the series before showing up in person in the episode "Resident Upheaval" where she was up against Myrtle for an available room in Sunset Canyon Retirement Home, sparking a competition between Lincoln and Clyde to see whose grandmother will move in. By the end of the episode, Gayle gets a double room while gaining Myrtle as her roommate.

McBride family pets
 Cleopawtra (vocal effects provided by Dee Bradley Baker) – The McBride family's orange cat. Her name is a pun on "Cleopatra."
 Nepurrtiti (vocal effects provided by Dee Bradley Baker) – A lavender kitten that was obtained by the McBrides in "Baby Steps". Her name is a pun on "Nefertiti."

The Casagrande family
The Casagrandes are a Mexican American family of characters who are the extended family of the Santiagos. While the Casagrandes appear in multiple episodes of The Loud House, they later gained their own spin-off show. It is revealed in both shows that the Casagrandes live in fictional Great Lakes City which is three hours away from Royal Woods and in a neighboring state.

Ronnie Anne Santiago
Ronalda "Ronnie" Anne Santiago (voiced by Breanna Yde in S1E15B-S3E21 of The Loud House, Izabella Alvarez in S4E1-present of The Loud House and The Casagrandes) is the 11-year-old sister of Bobby, a tough tomboy who enjoys skateboarding, playing video games, and pranks. She wears a purple zipper hoodie, jean shorts, a white tank top (in "City Slickers" and "No Show! with the Casagrandes"), pink knee-high socks and purple shoes. Originally depicted as a bully who would annoy Lincoln with embarrassing pranks because she had a crush on him, she eventually becomes Lincoln's best female friend. A running gag is that one member of either her or Lincoln's family refers to one of them as the other's boyfriend/girlfriend which they both instantly deny. It is implied multiple times throughout the series, though, that they harbor feelings for each other.

Bobby Santiago
Roberto Alejandro Martinez-Millan Luis "Bobby" Santiago Jr. (voiced by Carlos PenaVega, portrayed by Matt Van Smith in A Loud House Christmas) is a 17-year-old (18-year-old season 5 onward) boy who is Lori's boyfriend and the older brother of Ronnie Anne. He wears a cream T-shirt, a green jacket, blue jeans, a black and yellow belt, and brown shoes. Bobby does a lot of odd jobs in Royal Woods. In "Save the Date", it is shown that Bobby will retaliate if his sister Ronnie Anne gets offended, even if it means breaking up with Lori (to that point he immediately regrets doing). Although he and his family moved away to live with the Casagrande family in Great Lakes City in "The Loudest Mission: Relative Chaos", Bobby and Lori managed to find a way to make their relationship work. Originally working in the Casagrande family bodega as cashier and stockboy, Bobby developed a tendency to get trapped in the dairy freezer, seen in "City Slickers" and "The Spies Who Loved Me". In "Movers and Fakers", Bobby moves into his own apartment in the same building to get his own space after a former tenant moves to France.

Maria Casagrande-Santiago
Maria Casagrande-Santiago (voiced by Sumalee Montano) is Ronnie Anne and Bobby's mother, Carlos' sister, and Rosa and Hector's daughter. She works as a nurse at a local hospital. When the Santiago's move to Great Lakes City, Maria works at the local hospital as an emergency room nurse. In at least two episodes so far, she is shown to have childish arguments with her brother Carlos.

Arturo Santiago
Dr. Arturo Santiago (voiced by Eugenio Derbez) is Bobby and Ronnie Anne's father who works as a doctor at Physicians with Missions who have their headquarters in Great Lakes City. He is currently operating in Peru where he helped to build a hospital. Arturo's work is liked by Carlos Casagrande and Hector Casagrande develops a scowling look when around him implying that he was not pleased with Maria and Arturo's divorce.

In "Operation Dad", Arturo visits Great Lakes City for a conference causing Ronnie Anne to find a way to make him move in after roughing it for some time. After some attempts fail, Ronnie Anne was able to see him off. Upon looking at the scrapbook she left him, Arturo contacts his boss at Physician Without Missions to let him work at Great Lakes City's Physicians Without Missions HQ while another doctor covers for him.

Rosa Casagrande
Rosa Casagrande (voiced by Sonia Manzano) is Ronnie Anne and Bobby's grandmother, Maria and Carlos' mother, and Lupe and Lazaro's daughter. She is the matriarch of the Casagrande family and the building manager of their apartment building. She is a skilled cook and uses a variety of home remedies to heal people and ward off spirits. In "15 Candles", it is revealed that Rosa was unable to a get a Quinceañera when she was young.

Hector Casagrande
Hector Rodrigo Casagrande-Guiterrez (voiced by Ruben Garfias) is Ronnie Anne and Bobby's grandfather and Maria and Carlos' father. He is the patriarch of the Casagrande family and the proprietor of the Casagrande Mercado on the ground floor of the family's apartment building. Hector is gossipy and knows how to play the guitar while also having his own band. In "Battle of the Grandpas", it is revealed that Hector used to be a bull rider in his youth.

Carlos Casagrande
Carlos Casagrande (voiced by Carlos Alazraqui) is Ronnie Anne and Bobby's uncle, Maria's brother, and Rosa and Hector's son. He is a high-spirited and sensitive father of four and works as a professor at a local university. Carlos reads many books and can dispense rather inane trivia. In "Going Overboard", it was revealed that he was a popular skater in college named Carlos X. He had to stop after marrying Frida. In "Skaters Gonna Hate", it is revealed that Carlos in his alias of Carlos X had a history with Tony Hawk.

Frida Puga-Casagrande
Frida Puga-Casagrande (voiced by Roxana Ortega) is Ronnie Anne and Bobby's aunt and Carlos' wife. She is an avid artist and photographer who gets emotional over a variety of mundane moments and bursts into tears at the drop of a hat. In addition, Frida contributes art to The Art Space. In "Miss Step", it is revealed that Frida is an expert at Baile Folklorico. Her maiden name is named after staff member Miguel Puga.

Carlota Casagrande
Carlota Casagrande (voiced by Alexa PenaVega) is the eldest of Carlos and Frida's children, their only daughter, Rosa and Hector's granddaughter, and the cousin of Bobby and Ronnie Anne. She is a cheerful, happy-go-lucky admirer of vintage fashion and has a following on social media.

Carlos "CJ" Casagrande Jr.
Carlos "CJ" Casagrande Jr. (voiced by Jared Kozak) is the second eldest and the eldest son of Carlos and Frida's children, Rosa and Hector's grandson, and the cousin of Bobby and Ronnie Anne. He was born with Down syndrome and possesses a very sunny disposition. CJ loves to play pretend games and likes pirates. The episode "Short Cut" reveals that CJ is good at cutting hair.

Carlino "Carl" Casagrande
Carlino "Carl" Casagrande (voiced by Alex Cazares) is the second youngest of Carlos and Frida's children, Rosa and Hector's grandson, and the cousin of Bobby and Ronnie Anne. He has a selfish and macho personality and hatches a variety of get-rich-quick schemes, but is ultimately very childish. Carl likes to play with toys, especially trains. In addition, he also has a crush on Lori much to the dismay of Lori and Bobby. In "Slink or Swim", Carl was revealed to not be able to swim until Bobby taught him in exchange that Carl teaches him how to tie his shoes. As seen in "Do the Fruit Shake", Carl is shown to be an expert DJ. Despite his selfishness, he still really cares about his family.

Carlitos Casagrande
Carlitos Casagrande (voiced by Roxana Ortega up to The Casagrandes ep. 6A, Cristina Milizia from ep. 7 onward) is the youngest of Carlos and Frida's children, Rosa and Hector's grandson and the cousin of Ronnie Anne. He has noticeably orange hair and a propensity to mimic those around him. He is just beginning to learn how to talk as seen in "Copy Can't."

Casagrande family pets
The Casagrandes have pets of their own:

 Sergio (voiced by Carlos Alazraqui) – The Casagrande family's pet scarlet macaw. He has a sassy personality and acts like an alarm clock. He is named after cartoonist Sergio Aragonés, famous for his work in Mad Magazine.
 Lalo (vocal effects provided by Dee Bradley Baker) – The Casagrande family's friendly pet English Mastiff. Despite his large size, he tends to get scared easily. In the episode "Perro Malo", it is revealed that Lalo was adopted as a puppy by Hector, and has a twin brother named Malo. He is named after cartoonist Lalo Alcaraz, author of the comic strip La Cucaracha; editorial cartoons; and the show's cultural consultant, consulting producer, and writer.

The Chang family
The Changs are a Chinese American family that arrive in Great Lakes City and moved into Apartment 3A above the Casagrandes' apartment.

Sid Chang
Sidney "Sid" Chang (voiced by Leah Mei Gold) is the cheerful, happy-go-lucky, energetic and high-spirited 12-year-old daughter of Stanley and Becca Chang, Adelaide's older sister, and Ronnie Anne's best friend and neighbor. In "Friended! with the Casagrandes", the two of meet and quickly become best friends. Sid always wants to try new things. She is also an expert at robotics.

Stanley Chang
Stanley Chang (voiced by Ken Jeong) is the Chinese father of Sid and Adelaide. He works as a subway conductor in Great Lakes City's subway system called the GLART (short for Great Lakes Area Rapid Transit).

Becca Chang
Becca Chang (voiced by Melissa Joan Hart) is the mother of Sid and Adelaide and the wife of Stanley. She works as a zoologist. The episode "How to Train Your Carl" reveals that Becca is currently working at the Great Lakes City Zoo.

Adelaide Chang
Adelaide Chang (voiced by Lexi Sexton) is the six-year-old sister of Sid. Sid describes her as a "professional sass bucket." Adelaide can be emotional as seen in "Croaked" when her pet frog Froggy passed away. The episode "Karate Chops" reveals that Adelaide is an expert at karate and has karate skills that surpass Carl. She also has a love for animals that rivals Lana's.

Froggy 2
Froggy 2 (vocal effects provided by Dee Bradley Baker) is a frog who is Adelaide's pet and the successor of Froggy.

Breakfast Bot
Breakfast Bot (voiced by Carlos Alazraqui) is a robot created by Sid Chang who has a toaster for a chest and upper back, a toaster oven for an abdomen and lower back, a spatula for a right hand, a whisk for a left hand, and one wheel instead of legs.

Royal Woods Schools
This section lists the faculty and students of Royal Woods Elementary, Middle, and High School:

Royal Woods Elementary School
 Wilbur T. Huggins (voiced by Stephen Tobolowsky) – The strict principal of Royal Woods Elementary School. Like Lincoln and Clyde, he has also been a fan of Ace Savvy since his childhood. It is revealed in "Absent Minded" that he is the alumnus of Royal Woods Elementary who got perfect attendance 30 years before Clyde. In "The Write Stuff", Principal Huggins does his writing the standard way when he oversees the school's Writing Club. This conflicted with Rita's ways of writing until a poetry performance done by the Writing Club at the Burnt Bean coffee shop in Fern Valley causes Superintendent Chen to be impressed with both Rita and Principal Huggins. Later episodes of season four revealed that Principal Huggins started to wear a brown toupee that is made of real horsehair.
 Agnes Johnson (voiced by Susanne Blakeslee) – A fifth-grade teacher at Royal Woods Elementary School who Lincoln and Clyde had as a teacher, until "Schooled!" when Lincoln and Clyde now attend middle school.
 Cheryl Farrell (voiced by Grey DeLisle) – The school secretary at Royal Woods Elementary School who speaks with a Southern accent. The episode "Schooled!" reveals that Cheryl has a younger twin sister named Meryl who looks and talks exactly like her (except with a few differences) and works at Royal Woods Middle School.
 Coach Pacowski (voiced by Jeff Bennett) – A gym teacher at Royal Woods Elementary School with a stern and authoritarian personality who has a crush on Agnes Johnson. In "Teachers' Union", it is revealed that Coach Pacowski enjoys mini-golf, has never left Michigan, and lives on a houseboat with his mother. Following a failed date with Agnes, he starts to fall in love with Nurse Patti after she patched him up from his obstacle course injuries and found out that they have a common hobby.
 Morticians Club - A group of goth children that Lucy is co-president of and are fans of The Vampires of Melancholia.
 Bertrand (voiced by James Arnold Taylor) - A small boy who is the original president of the Morticians Club. He resigned from his position in "A Grave Mistake" after his father Brad got a job on a party cruise called the S.S. Funtime forcing his family to move from Royal Woods. In "The Loathe Boat", Bertrand got uncomfortable being on the S.S. Funtime cruise with Brad and his mother Kim causing him to send a message pelican to the Morticians Club to get him off it during its time on the shores of Lake Eddy. After every attempt failed, Lucy helped Bertrand come clean by mentioning how the S.S. Funtime had made him miserable. As a compromise, Brad and Kim allowed Bertrand to stay with his Aunt Madeline in Royal Woods until they return from Croatia.
 Boris (voiced by Nika Futterman) - A tall, thin, and bald-headed member of the Morticians Club who plays the keyboard.
 Dante (voiced by Cristina Pucelli) - A short round member of the Morticians Club. He owns a pet snake.
 Haiku (voiced by Georgie Kidder) – An 8-year-old (9-year-old season 5 onward) goth girl who is Lucy's best friend and co-president of the school's Morticians' Club that Lucy is a part of, originally introduced as one of Lincoln's dates in "Dance, Dance Resolution". She has a hairstyle in which some of her hair covers her left eye. Haiku has a crush on an ostensibly 200-year-old vampire. In "A Grave Mistake", she and Lucy become co-presidents of the Morticians Club after Bertrand leaves Royal Woods. She is named after the poetry form Haiku.
 Morpheus (voiced by Richard Steven Horvitz) - A tall member of the Morticians Club who wears a blue cape. He owns a pet crow named Thorn.
 Persephone (voiced by Lara Jill Miller) - A tall member of the Morticians Club who carries around an umbrella.
 Norm (voiced by Jeff Bennett) – The janitor at Royal Woods Elementary School. He secretly keeps a friendly mutated rat with green eyes and two tails named Cinnamon in the school's basement because he did not want him to be studied by scientists. Lincoln, Clyde, Stella, Zach, Rusty, and Liam eventually find out by investigating rumors of a 'rat beast', but assure Norm they will keep his secret.
 Nurse Patti (voiced by Lara Jill Miller) – A friendly school nurse at Royal Woods Elementary who is Coach Pacowski's girlfriend because of their shared mini-golf hobby.

Royal Woods Middle School
 Principal Ramirez (voiced by Marisol Nichols) - The principal of Royal Woods Middle School.
 Chandler McCann (voiced by Daniel DiVenere) – Chandler is one of the most popular kids in Royal Woods Elementary School. He attends Royal Woods Middle School as of "Schooled!". Chandler first appeared in "The Waiting Game" and while originally appearing in a minor recurring role from seasons 1–4, Chandler gradually develops into Lincoln's arch-rival starting from the premiere of season 5. So far, the episode "Jeers for Fears" has been the only episode in which Chandler showed genuine respect towards Lincoln and Clyde.
 Chef Pat (voiced by James Arnold Taylor in S5E4B, Alex Cazares in a New York style accent in S5E23a-present) - The school chef at Royal Woods Middle School who went to Royal Woods High School with Rita when they were friends. The food she serves range from appetizing to non-appetizing.
 Coach Keck (voiced by Grey DeLisle) - The gym teacher at Royal Woods Middle School. The episode "Frame on You" revealed that Coach Keck is near-sighted and just got some new glasses.
 Girl Jordan (voiced by Catherine Taber) – One of Lincoln's 11-year-old (12-year-old season 5 onward) classmates. The two of them notably share a dodgeball rivalry. She is named and designed after staff member Jordan Rosato. As of "Schooled!", she now attends middle school.
 Liam Hunnicutt (voiced by Lara Jill Miller, portrayed by Gavin Maddox Bergman in The Really Loud House) – Lincoln's 11-year-old (12-year-old season 5 onward) friend with a bowl cut who speaks in a Southern accent and lives on a farm. He enjoys loud music, exclaiming that he wants the music "turned up to eleven", a reference to This Is Spinal Tap. As of "Schooled!", Liam now attends middle school.
 Margo Roberts (voiced by Lara Jill Miller in S2E2A-S3E10B, Brec Bassinger in S3E23B-present) – Lynn's best friend who is a member of each of her sports teams.
 Meryl Farrell (voiced by Grey DeLisle) – The school secretary at Royal Woods Middle School and the younger twin sister of Cheryl with light brown hair and a mole on her right cheek.
 Mr. Bolhofner (voiced by James Arnold Taylor, portrayed by Brian Thomas Smith in The Really Loud House) – As a very strict math teacher and a former soldier in the army in his 30s, Mr. Bolhofner expects his students to be in his classroom on time. Starting in season five, he now teaches his class in a wooden class trailer in the back of the main building where Lincoln and Chandler are two of his students. In addition, Mr. Bolhofner's appearance has gotten sloppy and he is shown to have a pet piranha named Hank. The episode "Rumor Has It" had rumors about Mr. Bolhofner being either an escaped convict, a mobster, or a cannibal named "Skullhofner" which are false. It is also revealed that he can do bear wrestling. In "For Sale By Loner", it is revealed that Mr. Bolhofner lives in a cabin in the woods to enjoy some peace and quiet, dislikes sports because his father was the head coach of his school's wrestling team, and gets stressed out by puzzles.
 Paula Price (voiced by Cree Summer) - A crippled girl in a right leg cast and crutches who is a member of the Turkey Jerkies. She is also part of Lynn's other sports teams despite her disability.
 Rusty Spokes (voiced by Wyatt Griswold in S1E10A-S4E26A, Owen Rivera-Babbey in S5E1-S5E14A, Diego Alexander in S5E16A-present, portrayed by Nolan Maddox in The Really Loud House) – The 11-year-old (12-year-old season 5 onward) talkative member of an unnamed bicycle group who is one of Lincoln's schoolmates. He becomes one of Lincoln's friends. In "Back in Black", it is revealed that Rusty has a brother named Rocky who has a mutual crush on Lucy. In "Pasture Bedtime", it is revealed that Rusty is allergic to hot sauce. As of "Schooled!", Rusty now attends Royal Woods Middle School and his voice is now deeper.
 Stella Zhau (voiced by Haley Tju, portrayed by Trinity Jo-Li Bliss in The Really Loud House) – An 11-year-old (12-year-old season 5 onward) tall Filipino American girl who moved to Royal Woods. She was initially recognized by her bow and hair bun hairstyle in "White Hare" before being introduced in "Be Stella My Heart" no longer sporting a bow and hair bun. Lincoln, Clyde, Liam, Rusty, and Zach thought that Stella had a crush on them until she stated that she just wanted to be friends with them, which they did. In "Schooled!", Stella now attends Royal Woods Middle School.
 Zachary "Zach" Gurdle (voiced by Jessica DiCicco, portrayed by Mateo Castel in The Really Loud House) – An 11-year-old (12-year-old season 5 onward) bespectacled red-haired boy who is one of Lincoln's friends and schoolmates. He is obsessed with conspiracy theories and aliens, and believes the U.S. government is spying on his family. According to Lincoln in "Overnight Success", Zach lives "between a freeway and a circus." In "Pasture Bedtime", it is revealed that Zach's hair is vulnerable to certain hair dyes that causes his hair to fall off temporarily. As of "Schooled!", Zach now attends middle school.

Royal Woods High School
 Becky (voiced by Lara Jill Miller) – A girl who is one of Lori and Leni's friends and one of Lori's classmates. In "Deal Me Out", it is revealed that Becky is a fan of Ace Savvy.
 Benjamin "Benny" Stein (voiced by Jessica DiCicco in S2E12B, Sean Giambrone in S3E25A-present) - A boy who is Luan's boyfriend. They start to have this relationship as shown in the episode "Stage Plight" where they kiss in Mrs. Bernardo's production of Romeo & Juliet. Benny has a marionette named Mrs. Appleblossom. In Luan's second Listen Out Loud podcast, it is revealed that Benny has a neighbor who leads a group of werewolf enthusiasts. In season six, Benny is shown to do jobs at different places like Dairyland and the Burpin' Burger. His last name was revealed in the "Winter Special" graphic novel.
 Kate Bernardo (voiced by Grey Griffin) - The drama teacher at Royal Woods High School who is an expert at one-person plays. While originally depicted as a tan-skinned woman with brown hair in "Jeers for Fears", she was later redesigned with light skin and black hair.
 Mazzy (voiced by Cristina Pucelli in S2E12B, Ry Chase in S416A-Present) - One of Luna's friends who is a member of the Moon Goats.
 Sam Sharp (voiced by Jill Talley in S2E12B, Alyson Stoner in S3E24B-present, portrayed by Zoë DuVall in A Loud House Christmas) – A 15-year-old (16-year-old season 5 onward) girl and Luna's girlfriend who is one of her fellow musicians in the Moon Goats and classmates. Sam has a younger brother named Simon, whom she considers as very obnoxious. Lana's second "Listen Out Loud" podcast and the episode "Animal House" reveals that Sam volunteers at the Royal Woods Pet Adoption Center alongside Lana.
 Sully (voiced by A.J. Locascio) - One of Luna's friends who is a member of the Moon Goats.

Cesar Chavez Academy
This section lists the faculty and students of the Great Lakes City school Cesar Chavez Academy:

 Principal Valenzuela (voiced by Carolina Ravassa) - The principal of Cesar Chavez Academy.
 Alexis Flores (voiced by Nika Futterman in S4E2B of The Loud House-S1E20A of The Casagrandes, Diego Olmedo in S210A-S223B, Connor Andrade in S304B-Present) - The son of Mrs. Flores who plays the tuba even when in the Cesar Chavez Academy junior band.
 Becky (voiced by Abby Trott) - A girl at Cesar Chavez Academy who is into masked wrestling and bullying. In "Throwing Pains", it is revealed that Becky doesn't get cold on even the coldest days. The episode "Perro Malo" reveals that Becky is the owner of Lalo's aggressive twin brother Malo.
 Casey (voiced by Christian J. Simon in S3E5A of The Loud House to S1E03A-S2E09A of The Casagrandes, Jay Hatton in S2E17B-onward) – The cool Cuban-American skateboarding friend of Ronnie Anne who wears a checkered baseball hat backwards. "Gossipy Girl" reveals that Casey keeps a jar of baby teeth in his hat.
 Gina Galiano (voiced by Elizabeth Bond) - Ronnie Anne's homeroom teacher at Cesar Chavez Academy.
 Laird (voiced by Sean Kenin) - A clumsy and awkward student at Cesar Chavez Academy with cone-shaped hair who is one of Ronnie Anne's friends and was formerly home-schooled. Laird is prone to being a victim of various misfortunes that happen to him. In "Home Improvement", it is revealed that Laird lives in a mansion. "Gossipy Girl" revealed that he picks his nose with his feet and he still carries his baby blanket and has never washed it.
 Mrs. Kernicky (voiced by Lauri Fraser) – An elderly woman who resides in Apartment 4A of the Casagrande's apartment building. She enjoys working out. The episode "A Very Casagrandes Christmas" reveals that she is a member of the Polar Bear Club where they enjoy cold swimming. In "Strife Coach", Mrs. Kernicky becomes the new gym teacher at Cesar Chavez Academy.
 Nikki (voiced by Natalie Coughlin) – A tall, skateboarding girl who is friends with Ronnie Anne. "Gossipy Girl" revealed that she is afraid of sock puppets and her right big toe is very hairy.
 Sameer (voiced by Makana Say in S3E5A of The Loud House to S1E03A-S1E15B of The Casagrandes, Nour Jude Assaf in S1E18B-S2E14, Jacob Mattathiparambil Lukose in S2E17B-S3E10A, Aryan Simhadri in S3E16A-Present) – One of Ronnie Anne's skateboarding friends who sports a missing tooth and big hair. He is revealed to have previously lived in Kansas. "Gossipy Girl" revealed that he wears lifts in his shoes to appear taller.

Recurring characters
This section lists those who recurred in The Loud House, The Casagrandes, and The Really Loud House:

 12 is Midnight - A K-pop group that Ronnie Anne and Sid like.
 Yoon Kwan (voiced by Eric Nam in S4E2B-S4E4B of The Loud House, Justin Chon in S24B-Present in The Casagrandes) - The lead singer of 12 is Midnight.
 Wo Yeon (voiced by Daisuke Tsuji) - Member of 12 is Midnight.
 Jin (voiced by Will Choi) - Member of 12 is Midnight.
 Jun-Soo (voiced by Isaiah Kim) - Member of 12 is Midnight.
 Han (voiced by Will Choi) - Member of 12 is Midnight.
 Bernie (voiced by Fred Tatasciore) - An elderly man who is one of Albert's friends and has a tendency to lose his false teeth as seen in "Head Poet's Anxiety". The episode "Resident Upheaval" reveals that Bernie is on the Sunset Canyon Retirement Home board.
 Bitsy (vocal effects provided by Dee Bradley Baker) - An African elephant living at the Great Lakes City Zoo.
 Bruno (voiced by Eric Bauza) - A hot dog vendor in Great Lakes City who owns a hot dog stand called "Hawt Dog."
 Bud Grouse (voiced by John DiMaggio) – The elderly, bald-headed, and grumpy neighbor of the Loud family in his 70s whose first name was revealed in the Family Tree graphic novel and the episode "The Write Stuff". In "11 Louds a Leapin'", it is revealed that Mr. Grouse tends to confiscate any items belonging to the Loud siblings that accidentally end up on his property (including Bobby). It is also revealed that Mr. Grouse has a large extended family that he cannot visit to due to financial difficulties. In most episodes, it is shown that Mr. Grouse can be bribed with certain foods like Lynn Sr.'s lasagna in exchange for favors.
 Chester "Chunk" Monk (voiced by John DiMaggio) – A burly man with a shaved head and a nose ring who is Luna's roadie. In "Roadie to Nowhere", Chunk's real name is revealed to be Chester. He was also revealed to have been a musical alumnus at Royal Woods High School and moved from Britain when he was young. In the same episode, it is revealed that he has his own band called Chunk and the Pieces and a flat that he lives in when he isn't doing events that does not require him sleeping in his van. Aside from this, he also works as a roadie for other bands as seen in the graphic novel Loud and Proud.
 Coach Niblick (voiced by Daran Norris) - A top golf coach at Fairway University.
 Dana Dufresne (voiced by Maddie Taylor) - A host of several pageants Lola competes in. She is introduced in "Toads and Tiaras" while passing as male, and has transitioned by "Gown and Out".
 Fiona (voiced by Alex Ryan) - A worker at Reininger's who is Leni's co-worker and work friend.
 Grant (voiced by Grant Palmer) - A worker at the Burpin' Burger who is a two-time employee of the month. When Lynn Sr. opened up Lynn's Table, Grant got a second job there.
 Hunter Spector (voiced by Brian Stepanek) - A ghost hunter who is the host of the TV show ARGGH! (short for Academy of Really Good Ghost Hunters), which Lincoln and Clyde watch.
 Jim Sparkletooth (voiced by Andrew Morgado) - A news reporter in Great Lakes City. He is also the host of "Dirty Secrets" where he exposes dirty secrets around Great Lakes City.
 Katherine Mulligan (voiced in the animated series and portrayed in A Loud House Christmas by Catherine Taber) – A news reporter who reports on different things. She sometimes talks in her announcing voice outside of newscasts.
 Kotaro (voiced by Phil LaMarr) – A Japanese-American man who is Lynn Sr.'s best friend and band-mate who plays the keyboard. When Lynn Sr. opened up Lynn's Table, Kotaro became one of the waiters. In Clyde's Listen Out Loud episode that had him shadowing Lynn Sr., it is revealed that Kotaro is on good terms with Mr. Grouse. In "Dad Reputation", Kotaro joins Lynn Loud Sr.'s band The Doo-Dads and plays the cowbell.
 Marcus (voiced by Carlos Alazraqui in S1E1B, Sean Crisden in S2E15A-Present) - An animal control officer in Great Lakes City.
 Margarita (voiced by Krizia Bajos) – A Puerto Rican hairdresser who resides in Apartment 4B of the Casagrande's apartment building. She is the proprietor of a salon called "Margarita's Beauty" that is across the street from her apartment building and often shares some gossip with Hector when she buys some things at the Casagrande Mercado.
 Fluffy and Pickles – Margarita's pet dogs. Fluffy is a Scottish Terrier who can only eat organic foods while Pickles is a pug who likes to play in mud puddles.
 Maybelle (voiced by Telma Hopkins) – An elderly African American woman with sunglasses and a picky and demanding personality who is a regular customer at the Casagrande Mercado. In "Do the Fruit Shake", it was revealed that Maybelle was part of a musical trio called the Tropical Fruits under the stage name of Mango.
 Mick Swagger (voiced by Jeff Bennett) – A rock star who is Luna's idol and is also liked by her friends. Luna closely follows his words because she became passionate about music when she was young by attending one of his concerts. In later episodes, Mick appears in Luna's imagination, often giving her advice on certain things.
 Miguel (voiced by Tonatiuh Elizarraraz) – A worker at Reininger's who is Leni's co-worker and work friend. He is also a part-time yoga instructor.
 Miranda (voiced by Cristina Pucelli) – A resident of Apartment 4D of the Casagrande's apartment building. She is shown to be good at playing hacky sack. In "Flight Plan", it is revealed that Miranda dislikes horror movies.
 Georgia (voiced by Shondalia White) – An African-American woman who is the roommate of Miranda. She is an expert at making house of cards.
 Ninja (vocal effects provided by Fred Tatasciore) – A St. Bernard who is owned by Miranda and Georgia. He has a tendency to sleep in any location.
 Mr. Gurdle (voiced by Curtis Armstrong) - The father of Zach. Like his son, he is obsessed with conspiracy theories and aliens.
 Mr. Nakamura (voiced by Bruce Locke) – A Japanese American man who lives in Apartment 4C of the Casagrande's apartment building.
 Cory Nakamura (voiced by Eric Bauza) - The teenage son of Mr. Nakamura who is an expert gamer. The episode "Store Wars with the Casagrandes" reveals that he is an insomniac.
 Nelson (vocal effects provided by Eric Bauza) – A Bearded Collie owned by Mr. Nakamura. He is revealed to be allergic to bees and is often trained to be a better pet by his owner. In "Never Friending Story", it is revealed that Nelson can't eat almonds as it makes him poop a lot.
 Mr. Scully (voiced by Phil LaMarr) - An African-American man who is the landlord of the apartment building where the Casagrandes live. Rosa works for him as the building manager.
 Mrs. Flores (voiced by Michelle C. Bonilla) – A woman who lives in Apartment 3B of the Casagrande's apartment building and is the mother of Alexis.
 Buttercup – Mrs. Flores' pet chihuahua. She has a tendency to eat anything in sight.
 Mrs. Gurdle (voiced by Grey DeLisle) - The mother of Zach. Like her son, she is obsessed with conspiracy theories and aliens. The episode "Kernel of Truth" revealed that she was part of a news team back when she attended Royal Woods Middle School.
 Ms. Carmichael (voiced by Kari Wahlgren) – The manager of Reininger's who becomes Leni's boss when she gets hired there.
 Nico (vocal effects provided by Dee Bradley Baker) - A night monkey living at the Great Lakes City Zoo. At different points, Nico can be seen in the Chang family's apartment when not at the Great Lakes City Zoo.
 Par (voiced by Sunil Malhotra) – A produce delivery boy who delivers produce to the Casagrande Mercado. In "The Never-Friending Story", it is revealed that Par is a thrill-seeker at the time when Bobby makes friends with him due to the fact that they use the same hair cream and have long-distance girlfriends with him having a girlfriend named Dori who lives in New York. In "Mexican Makeover", it is revealed that Par can perform heavy metal music. In "Karate Chops", it is revealed that Par runs a karate dojo as its sensei as he works to get more people to take his karate classes. In "Spin Off", it is revealed that Par used to be a sign spinner. In "The Bros in the Band", it is revealed that Par is part of a punk rock band called The GLC Chupacabras.
 Patchy Drizzle (voiced by John DiMaggio) - A weather man in Royal Woods.
 Phillip "Flip" Philipini (voiced by John DiMaggio, portrayed by Kevin Chamberlin in The Really Loud House) – The cheap and smug middle-aged owner of the gas station Flip's Food & Fuel that sells a frozen carbonated drink called the Flipee. He also works as a vendor when not at his gas station. It is shown in some episodes that Flip owns some side businesses out of his gas station like the pawnshop Pat's Pawn and Prawn, a ticket and tuxedo-selling business called Tucker's Ticks & Tux, a rental business called Rick's Rents & Rocks, and a driving/dumpster diving business called Dom's Driving & Dumpster Diving where he refers to his Pat, Tucker, Rick, and Dom aliases as his associates. In "Net Gains", it is revealed that Flip is the sponsor of the Turkey Jerkies, has unpaid citations in his car, and was recognized by some prison inmates on the prison's basketball court when he drove by, implying that he was in prison once. In "The Loudest Thanksgiving", Flip served as the episode's narrator and was the one who suggested to the Loud family and the Casagrande family that they alternate locations on Thanksgiving to keep Lori and Bobby from not spending Thanksgiving apart. In "Washed Up", the boat that Flip rents to the Loud family during their cruise on Lake Eddy has ores painted on and a bad engine. He was able to forgive their late fee when he rescues them and learns the fate of his boat. In "Recipe for Disaster", it was revealed that Flip went to the same middle school as Lynn Sr. when they were young and tended to get in trouble at school. In "Blinded by Science", it is revealed that Flip cannot feel pain upon dropping a cheese-filled drum on his foot, can hold his breath underwater for 5 minutes, can swallow many gallons of water at once, can burp out of his ear, can withstand 0 degree temperatures, and has strange anatomies on him like a heart in his belly, a liver in his neck, fish gills on his legs, four butt cheeks with two associated butt cracks, and a brain in his knee. The episode "Season's Cheatings" reveals Flip got his swindling tendencies when he was scammed by Scoots with a fake ticket to his middle school Christmas dance. The episode "Electshunned" reveals that Flip ran for Mayor of Royal Woods once, but lost when major dirt was spilled on him. The episode "Diss the Cook" revealed that he went to the same high school as Rita.
 Nacho (vocal effects provided by Audrey Wasilewski) - Flip's raccoon companion.
 Pizza Chef (voiced by Sean Kenin) - An unnamed pizza chef that runs the abruptly-named Pizza Restaurant in Great Lakes City. He was just called "Pizza Chef" in "Spin Off" when he lost to C.J. in the Great Lakes City Sign-Spinning Competition while representing his restaurant.
 Reizouko (voiced by Andrew Kishino) - A sumo wrestler residing in Great Lakes City.
 Rodney Spokes (voiced by Richard Steven Horvitz) - The father of Rusty and Rocky Spokes who works at the clothing store Duds for Dudes. In "Dad Reputation", Rodney joins Lynn Loud Sr.'s band The Doo-Dads and plays the drums.
 Romeo (voiced by Wilson Cruz) - The proprietor of the Great Lakes City art gallery called The Art Space.
 Sancho (vocal effects provided by Sunil Malhotra) – A deformed pigeon in Great Lakes City with one foot who likes to throw pigeon parties and is also Sergio's best friend.
 Scoots (voiced by Grey DeLisle, portrayed by Jill Jane Clements in A Loud House Christmas) – A sarcastic old woman in sunglasses with a rebellious streak who is mostly seen riding on a mobility scooter and is friends with Albert. She lives at Sunset Canyon Retirement Home, enjoys their pudding, and likes to cause trouble for others when she can. The episode "Resident Upheaval" reveals that Scoots is the head of the Sunset Canyon Retirement Home board.
 Seymour (voiced by Rob Paulsen) - A short elderly African-American man who is one of Albert's friends. In "Insta-gran", it is revealed that Seymour's left eye has a mind of its own. The episode "Resident Upheaval" reveals that Seymour is on the Sunset Canyon Retirement Home board.
 Street Cats (various vocal effects) - A clowder of black cats that reside in Great Lakes City. They often terrorize the Casagrandes where Lalo is even terrified of them.
 Theresa Davis (voiced by Yvette Nicole Brown) – The Mayor of Royal Woods. She cares very much about the citizens as she puts their safety and concerns before her own. In Lana's second "Listen Out Loud" podcast, it is revealed that Mayor Davis can do Capoeira. Her first name was revealed in the episode "Electshunned" when she won her mayoral election against Leni.
 Tyler (voiced by John DiMaggio) - A buff blonde-haired man who is Scoots' boyfriend. He is also an expert disc jockey.
 Vito Filliponio (voiced by Carlos Alazraqui) – An elderly Italian American man who is a regular customer at the Casagrande Mercado. He often shares some gossip with Hector. The episode "New Roomie" reveals that Vito is an expert at making meatballs and can do opera singing in his sleep. In "The Oddfather", Vito becomes Carlitos' godfather.
 Big Tony and Little Sal (vocal effects provided by Sean Kenin) – Vito's two pet dachshunds. Big Tony wears a gray hat and often chases squirrels while Little Sal wears a beige hat and thinks he's a cat.

Notes

References

Animated human characters
Characters
Nicktoon characters